Luis Emilio Villar (born March 15, 1967 in Carrilobo, Córdoba) is a retired male basketball player (2.03 metres) from Argentina, who competed for his native country at the 1996 Summer Olympics in Atlanta, Georgia, finishing in ninth place in the overall-rankings. He was nicknamed "Mili" during his career.

References
sports-reference

1967 births
Living people
Argentine men's basketball players
Olympic basketball players of Argentina
Basketball players at the 1996 Summer Olympics
Sportspeople from Córdoba Province, Argentina
Atenas basketball players
Boca Juniors basketball players
Pan American Games medalists in basketball
Pan American Games gold medalists for Argentina
Basketball players at the 1995 Pan American Games
Medalists at the 1995 Pan American Games